Clofilium is an antiarrhythmic agent.

Quaternary ammonium compounds
Antiarrhythmic agents
Chloroarenes